Sheikh Saeed bin Zayed bin Sultan Al Nahyan (born 1965 in Al Ain) is an Emirati politician, Abu Dhabi's Ruler's Representative, and member of Al Nahyan family of Abu Dhabi. He held the position of Chairman of the Maritime Port Authority (Abu Dhabi). He was a member of the Abu Dhabi Executive Council.

Biography
He is the son of Zayed bin Sultan Al Nahyan, the founder and first president of United Arab Emirates. He is the half brother of the President of the United Arab Emirates, Sheikh Mohamed bin Zayed Al Nahyan.

Al Nahyan was the chairman of Abu Dhabi's Seaports Department, and formerly held the position of Undersecretary at the Abu Dhabi Planning Department. He was a member of Abu Dhabi Executive Council between 2004 and 2010.

Football
Al Nahyan served as the Chairman of the UAE Football Association (2001–2002). He succeeded his half brother Sheikh Khalifa as the chairman of Al-Wahda Club before being replaced in 2011 by his full brother, Sheikh Diab bin Zayed Al Nahyan. His half brother Sheikh Mansour is the chairman of Al-Jazira Club and owner of Manchester City.

Ancestry

References

External links
Photo Gallery at UAE government

1966 births
Living people
Saeed bin Zayed Al Nahyan
People from Abu Dhabi
Emirati politicians
Children of presidents of the United Arab Emirates
Sons of monarchs